"My Friends" is a song by American rock band Red Hot Chili Peppers and the fourth track on their sixth studio album, One Hot Minute (1995). It is a melodic ballad and was released as the second single from the album. It is the only song from One Hot Minute to be included on their Greatest Hits compilation, though the music video for "Aeroplane" appears on the DVD. It became the band's third number-one single on the US Billboard Hot Modern Rock Tracks chart, where it remained for four consecutive weeks, and their first number one on the Billboard Album Rock Tracks chart, making it the band's first single to top both charts.

The single features two unreleased b-sides. "Stretch" (originally titled Stretch You Out) was intended for the album following the fade out of "One Big Mob". The two were planned to be one song titled "One Big Mob/Stretch You Out" however "Stretch" was not included.

Music videos
The surreal original music video depicts the band in many incarnations on a small boat, stranded in a large stretch of treacherous water. This video was directed by Anton Corbijn. Anthony Kiedis admits that he thought this video was not very good, as it was not realistic. A second video was made for the song, directed by Gavin Bowden, where they were in a studio performing the song. The video was shot in late 1994 at the start of the recording sessions for One Hot Minute, hence Flea had a beard in the video. It appears on their Greatest Hits DVD.

Live performances
"My Friends" was performed regularly during the One Hot Minute Tour. However, it hasn't been performed in full since 1996, only teased. 

On October 2, 2021, Chad Smith and Dave Navarro performed "My Friends" together for the first time in 25 years at the Ohana Festival. They were joined by Taylor Hawkins on vocals, Pat Smear on guitar and Chris Chaney on bass.

Track listings
CD single (1995)
 "My Friends" (album)
 "Coffee Shop" (album)
 "Let's Make Evil" (previously unreleased)
 "Stretch" (previously unreleased)

CD version 2 (1995)
 "My Friends" (album)
 "Coffee Shop" (album)
 "Let's Make Evil" (previously unreleased)

12-inch single (1995)
 "My Friends" (album)
 "Coffee Shop" (album)
 "Let's Make Evil" (previously unreleased)
 "Stretch" (previously unreleased)

Personnel
Red Hot Chili Peppers
 Anthony Kiedis – lead and backing vocals
 Flea – bass, backing vocals
 Dave Navarro – guitar
 Chad Smith – drums

Additional musicians
 Lenny Castro – percussion

Charts

Weekly charts

Year-end charts

References

1990s ballads
1995 singles
1995 songs
Music videos directed by Anton Corbijn
Red Hot Chili Peppers songs
Song recordings produced by Rick Rubin
Songs written by Anthony Kiedis
Songs written by Chad Smith
Songs written by Dave Navarro
Songs written by Flea (musician)